Maner Assembly constituency is one of 243 constituencies of legislative assembly of Bihar. It comes under Pataliputra Lok Sabha constituency along with other assembly constituencies viz. Danapur, Masaurhi, Phulwari, Paliganj and Bikram.

Area/ Wards

Maner comprises Maner CD block; Gram Panchayats: Anandpur, Kateshar, Sikandarpur, Parev, Daulatpur Simri, Mushepur, Shri Rampur, Bihta, Dayalpur, Daulatpur, Purshottampur Painathi, Bishunpura, Raghopur, Amhara, Kanchanpur Kharagpur, Sadisopur, Painal, Bela, Neora, Makhdoompur & Shri Chandpur of Bihta CD block.

Members of Legislative Assembly

Election results

2020

2015

2010

See also
 List of Assembly constituencies of Bihar
 Maner

References

External links
 

Assembly constituencies in Patna district
Politics of Patna district
Assembly constituencies of Bihar